Portal San Ángel is a shopping mall located on Avenida Revolución in Colonia Los Alpes in the San Ángel area of southern Mexico City.

It opened in 2017 and has 59,094 m2 of leasable area, 84 stores and 1935 parking spaces. Tenants include Sears, Sam's Club, Wal-Mart, H&M, Cinépolis, Chili's, Red Lobster, and P.F. Chang's.

References

Shopping malls in Greater Mexico City
Shopping malls established in 2017
San Ángel, Mexico City